Jeisson Enrique Martínez Aranibar (born 28 December 1994) is a Peruvian footballer who plays as a forward. He also holds Spanish passport.

Club career
Born in Lima, Martínez was a Sporting Cristal youth graduate before moving to Spain in 2012. He made his senior debut with Celtic Castilla CF in the regional leagues, before joining Tercera División side CF Rayo Majadahonda in 2013.

After achieving promotion to Segunda División B, Martínez moved to Fútbol Alcobendas Sport still in the fourth tier. After being rarely used, he signed for fellow league team Manzanares CF on 15 January 2016.

In July 2016, Martínez agreed to a contract with Aravaca CF in the fourth division. On 30 December he returned to Rayo Majadahonda, and contributed with eight goals in 27 appearances during the 2017–18 campaign as his side achieved promotion to Segunda División for the first time ever.

Martínez made his professional debut on 19 August 2018, starting in a 1–2 away loss against Real Zaragoza. The following 28 January, after featuring sparingly, he moved to third division side Real Murcia after terminating his contract with the Majariegos.

On 3 April 2019, Martínez joined fellow third division side CF Fuenlabrada after agreeing to a 18-month deal. He immediately became a starter, contributing with two goals in six league appearances as his side achieved promotion to the second level for the first time ever.

On 9 September 2020, Martínez signed for FC Ararat-Armenia. On 22 June 2021, Albacete Balompié announced the signing of Martínez from Ararat-Armenia.

References

External links

1994 births
Living people
Footballers from Lima
Peruvian footballers
Spanish footballers
Association football forwards
Segunda División players
Primera Federación players
Segunda División B players
Tercera División players
Divisiones Regionales de Fútbol players
CF Rayo Majadahonda players
CD Paracuellos Antamira players
Real Murcia players
CF Fuenlabrada footballers
Albacete Balompié players